0D (zero D) or 0-D may refer to:

 OD, IATA code for Darwin Airline
 Zero-day attack
 Zero-dimensional space
 0x0D, the hex representation of newlines on some platforms
 0DFx, an American punk band

See also
0° (disambiguation)
D0 (disambiguation)
OD (disambiguation)